Circle of Deception is a 1960 CinemaScope British war film directed by Jack Lee and starring Bradford Dillman, Suzy Parker and Harry Andrews.

Plot
A Canadian officer is sent on a secret and dangerous mission during World War II. His superior officers deceptively give him false information about the planned invasion of 1944. He is told that this secret information must not get into enemy hands. He is transported into occupied territory in a way that insures he will be captured. He resists torture, but finally tells all.  The Germans are misled and the Normandy landings succeed. The Canadian officer is now a broken man.

Cast
 Bradford Dillman as Captain Paul Raine 
 Suzy Parker as Lucy Bowen 
 Harry Andrews as Captain Thomas Rawson 
 Robert Stephens as Captain Stein 
 Paul Rogers as Major William Spence 
 John Welsh as Major Taylor 
 Ronald Allen as Jim Abelson 
 A. J. Brown as Frank Bowen 
 Martin Boddey as Henry Crow 
 Charles Lloyd-Pack as Ayres 
 Jacques Cey as Cure 
 John Dearth as Captain Ormrod 
 Norman Coburn as Carter 
 Hennie Scott as Small boy 
 Richard Marner as German colonel
 Walter Gotell as Phoney Jules Ballard

References

External links
 
 
 
 

1960 films
Films directed by Jack Lee
British World War II films
British black-and-white films
20th Century Fox films
CinemaScope films
British war drama films
Films based on short fiction
Films scored by Clifton Parker
1960s war drama films
World War II spy films
1960 drama films
Films with screenplays by Nigel Balchin
1960s English-language films
1960s British films